The Special Capital Region of Jakarta Regional People's Representative Council (abbreviated DPRD DKI Jakarta or simply DPRD DKI) is the unicameral legislature of the Indonesian province of Jakarta. The Council is composed of 106 members elected via party lists in the 2014 legislative election. Elections are held every five years and are conducted simultaneously with the nationwide legislative election.

It convenes in the DPRD DKI Jakarta Building, Central Jakarta.

History 
Under the Dutch East India Company's administration, a "College of Alderman" for Batavia was established on 24 July 1620. There was also the College van Heemraden (polder board). In 1905, a municipal body known as the Gemeenten Batavia was established, which was renamed to Stadsgemeente Batavia in 1926. During the Japanese occupation, an advisory body existed since September 1943.

Following Indonesian independence, a local representative body was established by the new Indonesian government, though it was dissolved shortly afterwards due to Dutch reoccupation of the city. After the transfer of sovereignty, a temporary elected council of 25 members was established in 1950, intended to be a temporary body although it ended up lasting until 1956, when new regulations on local legislation were issued.

Structure 
With 106 members, the council has one speaker and four deputy speakers. In addition, five commissions on separate topics exist:

Composition

Speakers 
Note: Italic denotes interim speaker.

References

External links 
Official website

Politics of Jakarta
Provincial assemblies of Indonesia